Jaane-Anjaane()  is a 1971 Bollywood drama film directed by Shakti Samanta .  The film stars Shammi Kapoor, Vinod Khanna and Leena Chandavarkar.

Cast
Shammi Kapoor as Ram Prasad 'Ramu' 
Leena Chandavarkar as Mala
Vinod Khanna as Inspector Hemant
Jayant as Shankar
Sandhya Roy as Koyli
Helen as Suzy
Sulochana Latkar as Shobha 
Lalita Pawar as Laxmi 
K.N. Singh as Poonamchand 
Dhumal as Dhondu 
Sajjan as Hemant's Father 
Gulshan Bawra as Munnu 
Birbal as Chunnu 
Murad as Judge
Sachin Pilgaonkar as Young Ramu

Plot 
While on a religious pilgrimage, Laxmi Prasad finds an abandoned baby at a temple, when she sees no around, she decides to keep him. When her husband, Shankar, returns from jail, they name the child Ramu. While Laxmi wants him to go to school, study and become someone important, Shankar wants him to gamble, partner him in bootlegging and smuggling. Ramu is unable to fit in school and decides to work with his dad. Thus Ramu grows up accepting crime as his career. Then a young woman named Mala enters his life, and both fall in love with each other. When Mala finds out about Ramu's career, she makes him promise that he will go straight. He does go straight, gets a job, and when he is laid off he takes to helping Dhondu catch fish. Then Ramu's world gets turned upside when Inspector Hemant, while apprehending Shankar, guns down Laxmi. An enraged Ramu decides that he must kill Hemant at any cost. Watch what impact this will have on Hemant's mom, his dad, and Mala herself as she watches Ramu descent into the very hell that she had tried to redeem him from.

Soundtrack
The soundtrack was composed by Shankar Jaikishan.

References

External links
 

1971 films
1970s Hindi-language films
1971 drama films
Films directed by Shakti Samanta
Films scored by Shankar–Jaikishan